Paulinet is a commune in the Tarn department in southern France.

Geography
The commune is traversed by the river Dadou. It is made of seven parishes and many smaller hamlets, eg. Connac, Le Masnau, Notre-Dame d'Ourtiguet, Paulin, Paulinet, Pommardelle, Ruèges, Saint-Jean-de-Jeannes, Terrabusset.

History
The commune was created as Paulin in 1790. It inherited the pre-Revolution community of Paulin boundaries. Many territorial adjustments occurred during the 19th century to remove enclaves and exclaves. In 1833, the westernmost part of the commune became an independent commune as Teillet. In 1897, the commune was renamed Paulinet.

See also
Communes of the Tarn department

References

Communes of Tarn (department)